NS1, NS 1, NS-1, NS.1, or variation, may refer to:

Non-structural protein 1
 NS1 influenza protein
 NS1 dengue protein, used for NS1 antigen test
 Human bocavirus NS1
 Carnivore bocaparvovirus 1 NS1
 Japanese encephalitis virus NS1
 Minute virus of mice NS1
 West Nile virus NS1
 Yellow fever virus NS1

Places
 Jurong East MRT station (station code: NS1), Jurong East, Singapore
 Kawanishi-Noseguchi Station (station code: NS01), Kawanishi, Hyōgo Prefecture, Japan
 Ōmiya Station (Saitama) (station code: NS01), Ōmiya-ku, Saitama, Japan
 Annapolis (provincial electoral district), constituency N.S. 01; Nova Scotia, Canada

Aerospace
 U.S.S. NS-1, a U.S. Navy airship; see British blimps operated by the USN
 RAF N.S. 1, a British NS class airship
 Spartan NS-1, U.S. military trainer biplane
 Stearman NS-1, U.S. military trainer biplane
 New Shepard 1, a Blue Origin reusable space launch vehicle booster rocket (booster #1)
 Blue Origin NS-1, a 2015 April 29 Blue Origin suborbital spaceflight mission for the New Shepard

Other uses
 Novelty seeking level 1, exploratory excitability
 ns (simulator), version ns-1, computer network simulation software
 Netscape Navigator 1.0/1.1; a webbrowser

See also

 NSI (disambiguation)
 NSL (disambiguation)
 NS (disambiguation)
 1 (disambiguation)